Romano Fogli (21 January 1938 – 21 September 2021) was an Italian football player and manager who played as a midfielder.

In 2021, he was inducted into the Italian Football Hall of Fame.

Club career
Fogli was born in Santa Maria a Monte, near Pisa. During his club career he played for Torino F.C., Bologna F.C. 1909, A.C. Milan, and Calcio Catania.

International career
At international level, Fogli earned 13 caps for the Italy national team from 1958 to 1967, and participated in the 1966 FIFA World Cup.

Managerial career
After retiring from playing football, Fogli became a manager, including a stint at Bologna in 1993.

References

External links

1938 births
2021 deaths
Sportspeople from the Province of Pisa
Italian footballers
Association football midfielders
Italy international footballers
1966 FIFA World Cup players
Torino F.C. players
Bologna F.C. 1909 players
A.C. Milan players
Catania S.S.D. players
Serie A players
Serie B players
Italian football managers
Bologna F.C. 1909 managers
Footballers from Tuscany